Minimig (short for Mini Amiga) is an open source re-implementation of an Amiga 500 using a field-programmable gate array (FPGA).

Minimig started around January 2005 as a proof of concept by Dutch electrical engineer Dennis van Weeren. He intended Minimig as the answer to the ongoing discussions within the Amiga community on implementing the Amiga custom chipset using an FPGA. The project's source code and schematics were released under version 3 of the GNU General Public Licence on 25 July 2007.

Original prototype 
The original Minimig prototype is based on the Xilinx Spartan-3 Starter Kit, the Original Amiga Chipset is synthesized in the FPGA. Two printed circuit boards are attached via the FPGA kit expansion ports. The first one holds a 3.3V Motorola 68000 type CPU. The second has a MultiMediaCard slot with a small PIC microcontroller acting as a disc controller that supports the FAT16 filesystem and does on-the-fly Amiga disk file (ADF) decoding.

      VGA-+-PS2  (joystick etc.)
          |
 CPU <-> FPGA <-> Microcontroller <-> Flashmemory
          |
         RAM

The prototype was shown at an Amiga meet and loaded most Amiga programs although bugs did exist. Van Weeren's personal preferences led to the use of verilog instead of VHDL on a PC using Xilinx Webpack software for code development.

Hardware

Platform 
As of Minimig rev1.0 board:
 Xilinx Spartan-3 400k gate (XC3S400-4PQ208C) FPGA using 82% capacity.
 Freescale MC68SEC000, 3.3V, at   However, there's no  MOVE sr,<EA> is privileged and there is no real replacement instruction. This does not seem to affect any programs yet.
 Amiga Chip RAM bus and Slow RAM merged into a single synchronous bus running at 
 2 MB 70 ns asynchronous SRAM organised as  banks.
 MCU PIC 18LF252-I/SP (An alternative is Atmel AVR) implements a FAT16 disk layout and handles loading of FPGA configuration and Kickstart. Simulates a floppy to the Amiga by encoding on the fly from ADF files. 
 MMC Flash memory card to load FPGA configuration, kickstart and software for the implemented computer.
 3× LEDs to display the disk activity, main power and Amiga power up status (no existing audio filter!) Amiga power up status led will change intensity to show audio filter status.
 Video D/A consists of 4 resistors for each color red, green, blue (4 bits/color) and output via VGA connector.
 Audio from an 8 bit dithering sigma-delta converter with 2nd order analogue filter.
 +5V DC main power (~200 mA).

Ports 
 Spare 3x generic I/O from the FPGA (GPIO)
 JTAG for programming chips (TMS, TDI, TDO, TCK)
 RS232 serial port
 2x Joystick of Atari 2600 DE9M type.
 DE15F VGA video (which can output PAL compatible signals to connect to SCART).
 MMC Flash memory card slot.
 PS/2 connector Keyboard + Mouse
 3.5 mm audio jack
 +5V DC 2.1 mm cylindrical DC plug power supply inlet.

Implementation 
 Motorola 68000 type CPU.
 Hardware OCS and  ECS, PAL & NTSC video switchable via OSD.
 512 kB SRAM for Kickstart used as ROM.
  Slow RAM expansion (originally 512 kB).
  Chip RAM (originally 1024 kB).
 On-screen display offers selection of ADF disk images from the SD/MMC card using the keyboard or a joystick.

Roadmap

Issues 
Several issues remain.  It needs a binary copy of the AmigaOS kickstart ROM from a real  or free re-implementation like AROS-68k which is not yet fully compatible but which continually improves.
The current firmware for loading ROM and floppy images is limited to a single root directory and 8.3 filenames.

Development tools used 

Software: Xilinx Webpack version 6.3.03i (2007-07-22 9.1). Time from HDL source to loadable configuration file (.bit) =   CPU cache and memory speed is vital for the Synthesis + Place & Route Silicon compiler in FPGA generation software.

Future 
Possible developments include a faster CPU, ECS chipset, AGA graphics (new FPGA board is required), hard disk, ethernet, small RISC-Core for enhanced AROS functions etc.

Use of a free kickstart replacement (e.g. AROS).

A networked version would eliminate the need for swapping flash memories.

Upgrades

Read/write support 
On 2008-09-03 a new FPGA core enables read/write support, as well as some Chipset improvements.

ARM controller board upgrade 
On 2008-12-22 a replacement board that fits in the PIC (MCU) controller socket were announced. It makes harddrive, 4x floppy disk and write support possible. The FPGA core is the same for the new ARM and PIC firmware but only the ARM has enough resources to support four drives. The PIC only supports two. The upgrade also allows one to select to increase the CPU speed from 7.09 to 49.63 MHz with a 4 KB zero waitstate CPU cache. But it requires an FPGA core to actually carry it out (which works with the 16 MHz 68SEC000 chips).
The harddrive support is available by a virtual A600/A1200 style GAYLE parallel ATA interface. Up to 551 kByte/s is possible with a minor hardware modification. Otherwise only ~300 kByte/s is possible.

USB peripherals and MIDI 
The Minimig port for the MiST board supports USB peripherals including USB mice, USB keyboards and USB mice as well as a physical MIDI interface.

Additional 2 MB RAM 
On 2008-12-22 a modification of the original PCB by piggybacking another set of SRAM chips enables up to 4 MiB of RAM in total.

AGA support 
The Minimig port for the MIST board has been updated to support major AGA features allowing it to run many AGA games. A binary release as well as the full source code is available under GPL.

An unreleased Minimig core has been upgraded with AGA support and extended to support at least 50 MiB of Chip memory on the prototype Replay board designed by Mike Johnson at FPGA Arcade.

Similar projects 
Jeri Ellsworth, who designed the C64 Direct-to-TV Commodore 64 on a chip ASIC, had a working Amiga on a chip prototype in 2003. Except for the 68000 processor and disk interface, everything was emulated inside a FPGA. However, the project was never finished or turned into an ASIC.

Illuwatar, a small private hardware designer in Sweden, implemented a Mini-ITX form factor version of the Minimig under the Open Source design License. This hardware version fits in standard Mini-ITX cases and has dimensions of 17 cm x 17 cm. Connecting ports in this version were moved to the back of the mainboard to comply with Mini-ITX requirements.

On 9 Feb 2008 ACube Systems announced the availability of finished Minimig v1.1 boards.

On 2006-10-11 Jens Schönfeld at Individual Computers revealed that they had been working on a commercial Amiga-in-FPGA for the past year called "Clone-A" that is similar to Minimig. In contrast to Minimig, Individual Computers's Clone-A was developed by a three-person development team employing a powerful logic analyzer. The system will use clone chips to replace CIAs, Paula, Gary, Agnus and Denise. The CPU will be the original from Motorola. Final chips will also include AGA and a working parallel port to enable 4-player games. Still unreleased since 2015.

Wolfgang Förster has completed the Suska project, which is an Atari ST-on-FPGA.

Inspired by Minimig Till Harbaum invented MIST, an open FPGA based implementation of Atari ST and Amiga intended to have a low price and be easy built at home. Different than Minimig, the 68000 CPU is not present as physical device but implemented inside the FPGA.

Inspired by MIST Alexey Melnikov invented MiSTer, an FPGA based implementation of Atari ST and Amiga, based on a commercial board by Terasic : DE10-nano. There are at least five so called "daughter boards" that enhance the capabilities of MiSTer.

Vampire V4 Standalone, released by Apollo Team in 2019, provides ECS/AGA chipset re-implementation, plus 68080 CPU and SAGA core, also using a field-programmable gate array (FPGA).

References

External links 

 Source code at Google Code
 Project home page (Offline)
 Project home page (Mirror)
 Official Discussion Forum

Home computer remakes
Amiga
Computer-related introductions in 2006
Open computers